The 1983 season of the African Cup Winners' Cup football club tournament was won by El Mokawloon SC in two-legged final victory against OC Agaza. This was the ninth season that the tournament took place for the winners of each African country's domestic cup. Thirty-four sides entered the competition, with Ajuda Sports withdrawing before the 1st leg of the first round.

Preliminary round

|}

First round

|}

Second round

|}

Quarterfinals

|}

Semifinals

|}

Final

|}

External links
 Results available on CAF Official Website

African Cup Winners' Cup
2